Heinsburg is a hamlet in central Alberta, Canada within the County of St. Paul No. 19.

John Heins, an early postmaster, gave the community his last name.

Demographics 
Heinsburg recorded a population of 60 in the 1991 Census of Population conducted by Statistics Canada.

See also 
List of communities in Alberta
List of hamlets in Alberta

References 

Hamlets in Alberta
Populated places on the North Saskatchewan River
County of St. Paul No. 19